The  Dead River is a tributary of the Androscoggin River in western Maine in the United States. The river flows from Androscoggin Lake, northwest through the town of Leeds  to the Androscoggin.

References

Tributaries of the Kennebec River
Rivers of Maine
Rivers of Androscoggin County, Maine